Salvador Viniegra y Lasso de la Vega (November 23, 1862 – April 29, 1915) was a Spanish historical painter and patron of the arts.

Biography
Born in Cádiz, Viniegra began studying law but soon decided to be a painter and entered the Escuela de Bellas Artes de Cádiz, where he was taught by Rámon Rodríguez Barcaza and José Pérez Jiménez. He concentrated initially on painting watercolors, and a series of works in that genre, which grew eventually into an album, earned him his first taste of public success, in 1877. In the following years, he won various painting prizes at regional exhibitions and traveled to Rome, where he devoted himself to the study of life drawing.

Returning to Spain in 1882, he competed that same year in the Exposición de Hernandéz, submitting the painting Un patio de Sevilla as his entry.  Later, another work of large proportions, La bendición de los campos en 1800, was exhibited at the Exposición Nacional de Madrid in 1887 and received the first prize in its category.

In 1890, he won a merit scholarship to study at the Academia Española de Bellas Artes in Rome where he resided until November 1896, and this Italian period marked the richest in his vast oeuvre. Displayed in Munich, Rome, and Budapest, his works were reproduced ceaselessly, making him one of the most popular painters in Europe. In 1897, La romería del Rocío was exhibited at the Sala Dante de Roma and at the Exposición Nacional de Bellas Artes de Madrid. It also appeared at the World's Fairs in 1898 in Munich and Vienna, where it won several gold medals. The painting continued its international tour when a Polish dealer agreed to exhibit it in various cities in Eastern Europe. Viniegra finally donated it to the Museo de Arte Moderno in Madrid in 1905.

Settling in Madrid, Viniegra was named the deputy director and conservator of the city's Prado museum in 1898. During this time, he became an important patron of the arts. Being a notable cellist himself, he gave particular support to musicians, among his beneficiaries being the composer Manuel de Falla and the cellist and conductor Juan Ruiz Casaux. He died in Madrid.

References

External links

19th-century Spanish painters
19th-century Spanish male artists
Spanish male painters
19th-century painters of historical subjects
20th-century Spanish painters
20th-century Spanish male artists
1862 births
1915 deaths
Orientalist painters
People from Cádiz
Spanish philanthropists
19th-century philanthropists